The Mitsubishi Concept-RA is a concept car manufactured by Mitsubishi Motors, and first revealed on at the North American International Auto Show in January 2008. Although there has been no official confirmation, the automotive press has speculated that this prototype presages the next generation of the Mitsubishi Eclipse.

Following the lead of other recent Mitsubishi prototypes, "green plastic" recyclable resin is used extensively in the body panels and interior for environmental reasons.

References

RA